The Diocese of Toledo may refer to:

 Roman Catholic Diocese of Toledo, Brazil
 Roman Catholic Diocese of Toledo, United States
 Roman Catholic Archdiocese of Toledo, Spain